"Remember Pearl Harbor" is an American patriotic march written by Don Reid and Sammy Kaye in the week immediately following the December 7, 1941 attack on the military facilities on the Hawaiian island on Oahu by naval forces of the Japanese navy.

Background

Ten days after news of the attacks on Pearl Harbor, Kaye's "Swing and Sway band" recorded the song in New York City, using Kaye's "Glee Club" for vocal harmonies. The tune was inspired and based on his undergraduate college’s own tune “Alma Mater, Ohio”. Although the group performed four takes, the first take was the chosen track for mastering, producer Leonard Joy supervising the recording and Kaye directing. Billboard magazine announced the song's release on the RCA Victor label in its January 17, 1942 issue. 

Two weeks after release, the song was #7 nationally in record sales and #10 in sheet music sales. The Victor Records 78 single peaked at #3 on the Billboard singles chart that year with a chart run of eight weeks. At years' end the song remained on several top 100 lists. By January 1943, Sammy Kaye had donated $4000 from the song's royalties to Navy Relief funds.

Legacy

In December 2017, President Donald Trump, honoring veterans of the Pearl Harbor attack in a ceremony at the White House, asked members in the room, "'Remember Pearl Harbor.' Have you heard that before a couple of times, 'Remember Pearl Harbor?'" One of the veterans, Michael "Mickey" Ganitch, boldly burst out in song, remembering lyrics 75 years old: "Let's remember Pearl Harbor as we go to meet the foe. Let's remember Pearl Harbor, as we did the Alamo. We will always remember how they died for liberty. Let's remember Pearl Harbor, and go on to victory."

External links
1942 78 release on Victor Records by Sammy Kaye. discogs.com.
Original recording on YouTube

References

1941 songs
1942 singles
American patriotic songs
Attack on Pearl Harbor
Songs of World War II